Veli Harçi (Gjirokastër 1850 - 1914), also known as Veli Harxhi, was one of the signatories of the Albanian Declaration of Independence.

References

19th-century Albanian politicians
20th-century Albanian politicians
People from Gjirokastër
People from Janina vilayet
Signatories of the Albanian Declaration of Independence
All-Albanian Congress delegates
1850 births
1914 deaths
Ottoman military officers